The 1916 Cork Senior Football Championship was the 30th staging of the Cork Senior Football Championship since its establishment by the Cork County Board in 1887.

Nils were the defending champions.

On 3 December 1916, Collegians won the championship following a 0-03 to 0-01 defeat of Fermoy in the final at the Cork Athletic Grounds. This was their first ever championship title.

Results

Final

Championship statistics

Miscellaneous
 Collegians became the first college side to qualify for the championship final and won a first title.

References

Cork Senior Football Championship